The Japanisches Palais (English: "Japanese Palace") is a Baroque building in  Dresden, Saxony, Germany. It is located on the Neustadt bank of the river Elbe.

History 
Built in 1715, it was extended from 1729 until 1731 to house the Japanese porcelain collection of King Augustus the Strong that is now part of the Dresden Porcelain Collection. After that, more Japanese crafts collections were put in it. However, it was never used for this purpose, and instead served as the Saxon Library. The palace is a work of architects Pöppelmann, Longuelune and de Bodt.

The Japanisches Palais was damaged during the allied bombing raids on 13 February 1945. The restoration of much of the building and of the gardens was completed in the 1980s by the French government.

Today, it houses three museums: the Museum of Ethnology Dresden, the State Museum for Pre-History (Landesmuseum für Vorgeschichte) and the Senckenberg Natural History Collection (Senckenberg Naturhistorische Sammlungen Dresden).

See also
 List of Baroque residences

References

External links

 Japanisches Palais Homepage of the Dresden State Art Collections
Japanisches Palais at Dresden website 
 https://www.dvfk-berlin.de/herzig_friedrichs_karge_2019_japanische_palais/
 https://www.saechsische.de/so-plante-august-sein-japanisches-palais-3221223.html 
 http://www.arte4d.de/details/items/japanisches-palais.html

Houses completed in 1731
Palaces in Dresden
Baroque architecture in Dresden
Baroque palaces in Germany